Donald Max Flynn (September 14, 1934, in Durant, Oklahoma – April 14, 2010) was an All-American quarterback, NFL quarterback, soldier and businessman. He grew up in Texas, lettering in baseball, basketball and football for MVP again his senior year of college.

Flynn graduated from the University of Houston with a degree in petroleum engineering and minored in geology. After college, Flynn served in the Army and played four years of professional football. Flynn played for the Dallas Texans, who later became the Kansas City Chiefs, and the New York Titans, who later became the New York Jets. Flynn also played in the Canadian league for the Edmonton Eskimos. At the professional level, Flynn was a defensive back and quarterback, he started every game for both the Texans and the Titans.

While playing in the NFL, Flynn made about $8,500 a year, and so after an injury to his knee, Flynn decided to take a job with Skelly Oil Company in Duncan, Oklahoma. Flynn later relocated to Tulsa, Oklahoma, and went to work for White Shield Oil and Gas Company. In 1972, Flynn formed Flynn Energy Corp. and by 1976 the company had been named Oklahoma's Stock of the Year by Oklahoma Business magazine. Less than two years later, Flynn sold the oil-and gas firm for over $30 million. During the period from 1972 to 1978, the company drilled 342 wells in Oklahoma, Louisiana, Michigan, Texas, West Virginia and Pennsylvania, Arkansas and Colorado. During this period the company developed 80.3 BCF of Net Equivalent Gas Reserves having a Total Income of $152 MM. The Company went public in February 1974 and was publicly traded, (OTC), until the assets were sold in December 1978, to Reserve Oil and Gas for a total cash consideration of $54 MM. This was an asset sale, and the Company was immediately reorganized after the closing. The second Flynn Energy Corp. was established at that time. This company was run much like the first, and between 1978 and 1989 the company drilled 274 wells and earned $390 million. Flynn went on to spend over 40 years in the oil and gas industry, he founded and managed two successful publicly traded companies. Flynn also founded DMF Inc. which is a privately owned corporation. DMF Inc. holds interest in 19 producing wells in Michigan, Oklahoma, Texas, and Louisiana. Between Flynn Energy Corp. and DMF Inc., the net income for both companies totaled $542 million.

Flynn met his wife, Patricia Fenwick, while she was working as a flight attendant on a Braniff flight he was taking with one of his football teams. A year later they were married and not long after that they had four children, Brett, Don, Kelly, and Michael.

Flynn and his family lived in Tulsa, Oklahoma, in Southern Hills, where he enjoyed playing golf. He also has four granddaughters Mallory Flynn-Hodges, Lindsay Flynn, Samantha Wright, and Rebecca Flynn. Paramount in his life were love of his family, his Christian faith, competitive sports, country-western music and regard and concern for this exceptional country.

On Wednesday April 14, 2010 Don Flynn died in the Intensive care unit of St. Johns Medical Center in Tulsa, Oklahoma. He was 75.

References

1934 births
2010 deaths
Dallas Texans (AFL) players
Edmonton Elks players
New York Titans (AFL) players
Houston Cougars football players